A fabula togata is a Latin comedy in a Roman setting, in existence since at least the second century BC. Lucius Afranius and Titus Quinctius Atta are known to have written fabulas togatas. It is also treated as an expression that functioned as the overall description of all Roman types of drama in accordance with a distinction between Roman toga and  pallium. There are recorded sources that cite how this drama could be obscene and moralistic.

By mid-second century BC the fabula togata had become one of the two types of drama that constituted a bifurcated Roman comedy along with fabula palliata. The fabula togata was distinguished from the palliata primarily by its use of Roman or Italian characters, transferring the comic situations of the bourgeois palliata to the lower-class citizens of the country towns of Italy. The palliata was based on originals of Greek New Comedy, tragedies from Attic sources as well as the grand dramatization of Rome's past. In the togata the typical clothing worn by the all male actors was the toga, a typically Roman dress, while the palliata took its name from the pallium.

There is no existing complete fabula togata but there are surviving fragments that indicate aspects of the creative practice.

See also
Fabula atellana
Fabula crepidata
Fabula palliata
Fabula praetexta
Fabula saltata
Theatre of ancient Rome

References
 Peter Lebrecht Schmidt "Togata" in: Brill's New Pauly, Antiquity volumes edited by: Hubert Cancik and Helmuth Schneider. Consulted online on 21 July 2017

Comedy
Latin-language literature
Ancient Roman theatre
History of theatre